Alessandro Cicutti (born 26 May 1987 in Gemona del Friuli) is an Italian football goalkeeper.

He signed in 2011-2012 season for Vicenza.

Caps on football series 

Lega Pro Prima Divisione : 4 (-3)

Serie D : 72 (-75)

Total : 76 (-78)

See also
Football in Italy
List of football clubs in Italy

References

External links
http://aic.football.it/scheda/20248/cicutti-alessandro.htm

1987 births
Living people
Italian footballers
A.S.D. Paternò 1908 players
U.S. Alessandria Calcio 1912 players
L.R. Vicenza players
People from Gemona del Friuli
Association football defenders
U.S. Imperia 1923 players
Footballers from Friuli Venezia Giulia